Western Air Lines, Inc v Criswell 472 US 400 (1985) is a US labor law case, concerning discrimination.

Facts

Judgment
The Supreme Court held it was lawful to require airline pilots to retire at 60, because the Federal Aviation Administration forbid using pilots over 60 in aviation. But the Court held that refusing to employ flight engineers over that age was unjustified as there were no such FAA requirements.

See also

US labor law

Notes

References

United States labor case law
United States employment discrimination case law